Zakaria Haddouche (born 19 August 1993) is an Algerian football player who plays for ASO Chlef.

Club career
On 12 December 2011 Haddouche made his professional debut for ASO Chlef in round 14 of the 2011–12 Algerian Ligue Professionnelle 1 against USM Alger. He came on as a 45th-minute substitute for Kheireddine Selama. On 2 March 2012 Haddouche scored his first goal for ASO Chlef in the qualifying round of the 2012 CAF Champions League against ASFA Yennenga of Burkina Faso. Coming as a 57th-minute substitute, he scored a goal in the 74th minute as ASO Chlef won the game 4–1 to qualifying to the next round. On March 10, he scored again, this time in the Round of 16 of the 2011–12 Algerian Cup against CRB Aïn Djasser.

In 2019, Haddouche signed a two-year contract with USM Alger.
In 2021, he signed a contract with CS Constantine.

References

External links
 
 

1993 births
2013 African U-20 Championship players
Algeria youth international footballers
Algeria under-23 international footballers
Algerian footballers
Algerian expatriate footballers
Algerian Ligue Professionnelle 1 players
Saudi First Division League players
ASO Chlef players
ES Sétif players
Khaleej FC players
Living people
People from Tlemcen
2015 Africa U-23 Cup of Nations players
Footballers at the 2016 Summer Olympics
Olympic footballers of Algeria
Association football forwards
MC Alger players
Expatriate footballers in Saudi Arabia
Algerian expatriate sportspeople in Saudi Arabia
21st-century Algerian people